The 2013 Presbyterian Blue Hose football team represented Presbyterian College in the 2013 NCAA Division I FCS football season. They were led by fifth-year head coach Harold Nichols and played their home games at Bailey Memorial Stadium. They were a member of the Big South Conference. They finished the season 3–8, 1–4 in Big South play to finish in a tie for fifth place.

Schedule

Source: Schedule

Game summaries

@ Wake Forest

Brevard

@ Furman

Charlotte

@ Wofford

VMI

Point

Charleston Southern

@ Liberty

@ Coastal Carolina

Gardner–Webb

References

Presbyterian
Presbyterian Blue Hose football seasons
Presbyterian Blue Hose football